Lucy Gallant is a 1955 American drama film directed by Robert Parrish and written by John Lee Mahin and Winston Miller. The film stars Jane Wyman, Charlton Heston, Claire Trevor, Thelma Ritter, William Demarest and Wallace Ford. The film was released on October 20, 1955, by Paramount Pictures.

The story is based on a novella, "The Life of Lucy Gallant," by Texas-born author Margaret Cousins (1905-1996), published in Good Housekeeping magazine in May 1953.

It was the last film Pine-Thomas Productions made at Paramount, an association that had endured since 1940.

Plot
While traveling from New York City to Mexico, the stylish Lucy Gallant is stranded by a storm in fictitious New City, Texas, where rancher Casey Cole helps find her suitable lodging. The public reaction to her fashions persuades Lucy to sell the contents of her trousseau, and she decides to stay and open a dress shop.

Lucy lives at Molly Basserman's boarding house and runs her store out of Lady "Mac" MacBeth's brothel, called the Red Derrick. She obtains a loan from banker Charlie Madden. She is courted by Casey, who learns that Lucy was jilted at the altar when her fiance found out about her father's dishonest business practices.

Casey insists that she give up her business. They quarrel, and after joining the United States Army during World War II, he becomes engaged to a fashion model in Paris. But Casey soon returns to Texas to save Lucy from banker Madden's underhanded business dealings. He also salvages their romance.

Cast
Jane Wyman as Lucy Gallant
Charlton Heston as Casey Cole
Claire Trevor as Lady "Mac" MacBeth
Thelma Ritter as Molly Basserman 
William Demarest as Charlie Madden
Wallace Ford as Gus Basserman 
Tom Helmore as Jim Wardman 
Gloria Talbott as Laura Wilson 
James Westerfield as Harry Wilson
Mary Field as Irma Wilson 
Texas Governor Allan Shivers as himself
Edith Head as herself

Production
The film was based on a novella, "The Longest Day of the Year" (which was later turned into the novel "The Life of Lucy Gallant"). Paramount bought the screen rights and hired John Lee Mahin to adapt it. The story was set in Oklahoma but the film is set in Texas.

The producers wanted Joan Crawford for the lead. Eventually the role went to Jane Wyman, who was borrowed from Warner Bros. Charlton Heston, who had just made The Far Horizons for Pine-Thomas, signed to play her co star. John Lee Mahin wrote the script and Robert Parrish agreed to direct. Thelma Ritter and Claire Trevor were cast in the two main support roles.

Filming started August 18, 1954. Texas Governor Allan Shivers plays himself. So too does costumer Edith Head.

Edith Head's designs were later sold commercially.

Jody McCrea made his film debut in the picture.

See also
List of American films of 1955

References

External links
 
Lucy Gallant at TCMDB
Review of film at Variety
Lucy Gallant at BFI

1955 films
American drama films
1955 drama films
Paramount Pictures films
Films directed by Robert Parrish
1950s English-language films
1950s American films